Mystic Man is the fourth studio album by Peter Tosh. All songs were composed by Peter Tosh. It was released in 1979 by Rolling Stones Records (his second album for the label), EMI, and Intel Diplo (in Jamaica).

The album's cover photo, by Annie Leibovitz, shows Tosh's head in profile, with his head cupped in his hands, as if in prayer. Sw. Anand Prahlad, in his book Reggae Wisdom, suggested that on this and previous album Bush Doctor, Tosh was seeking to portray himself in the role of "healer and prophet".

The album peaked at number 6 in Italy, 17 in Germany, 25 in Austria, 27 in Sweden, 44 in the Netherlands, and at 123 on the Billboard 200.

The album was reissued in 2002 with five bonus tracks.

Reception

Lester Bangs, reviewing the album for Rolling Stone, saw Mystic Man as an improvement over Bush Doctor and viewed the 9-minute disco-driven "Buk-in-Hamm Palace" as the album's strongest track. Jonathan Daümler-Ford, for the Birmingham Daily Post, thought it lacked the immediate impact of the previous album, but "sneaks up from behind" with what he described as "one of the best reggae tracks I have heard ("Can't You See") and several close contenders", calling it a "slow starter but a strong stayer". Ralph Heibutzki, for Allmusic, saw the album as Tosh reasserting his "cranky contrarian militancy", "a proud declaration of Tosh's lifestyle, which he pointedly contrasts against Western consumerist decadence", viewing "The Day the Dollar Die" as a roots reggae classic.

Dave Thompson saw the album as a disappointment, picking out "Jah Seh No" and "Rumours of War" as highlights. Village Voice critic Robert Christgau wrote: "Mysticism should keep its own counsel; boast about it, translate your supposed experience of the ineffable into any but the most simpleminded ideology, and ninety-five times out of a hundred you'll sound like a smug asshole. Tosh's ever more preachy vocal stance does nothing for his dopey puns ('shitty' for 'city,' far out), his confused political-economic theories, or his equation of hamburgers with heroin. And his musicians sound like the bored pros rockers so often turn into."

Track listing
All tracks composed by Peter Tosh

"Mystic Man"
"Recruiting Soldiers"
"Can't You See"
"Jah Seh No" 
"Fight On"
"Buk-In-Hamm Palace"
"The Day The Dollar Die"
"Crystal Ball"
"Rumours Of War"
 
Bonus tracks on "The Definitive Remasters" 2002 EMI CD release

10. "Buk-In-Hamm Palace" (12" version)
11. "Mystic Man" (long version)
12. "Fight On" (instrumental)
13. "Recruiting Soldiers" (version)
14. "Dubbing Buk-In-Hamm" (from 12" single)

Personnel
Peter Tosh - lead vocals, guitar, keyboards
Robbie Shakespeare - bass guitar
Sly Dunbar - drums, percussion 
Mikey Chung - keyboards, guitar, percussion 
Robbie Lyn - organ, piano 
Uziah Thompson - percussion; repeater drums on "Fight On"
George Young - alto saxophone, flute 
Howard Johnson - baritone saxophone  
Lou Marini - tenor saxophone, flute 
Ed Walsh - Oberheim synthesizer on "Recruiting Soldiers", "Jah Seh No" and "Buk-In-Hamm Palace"
Barry Rogers - trombone 
Mike Lawrence - trumpet 
Sammy Figueroa - percussion; congas on "Mystic Man" and "Buk-In-Hamm Palace" 
Clive "Azul" Hunt, Mikey Chung - horn arrangements
Brenda White King, Gwen Guthrie, The Tamlins, Yvonne Lewis - backing vocals
Keith Sterling - acoustic piano on "Mystic Man" 
Ed Elizalde - lead guitar on "Can't You See" 
Technical
Geoffrey Chung - recording, mixing
James Nichols, Michel Sauvage - assistant engineer
Dennis King - mastering
Annie Leibovitz - photography

Charts

References

Peter Tosh albums
1979 albums
Rolling Stones Records albums